The District Council of Karoonda  was a local government area in South Australia seated at Karoonda from 1922 until 1979.

The council was established about a decade after the township of Karoonda itself was founded on 26 January 1922. At the time of establishment the council district included the whole the hundreds of Hooper, Marmon Jabuk, Molineux and Vincent as well as southern portions of the hundreds of Wilson and McPherson, all being in the northern half of the County of Buccleuch.

Karoonda amalgamated with the District Council of East Murray in 1979 to form the new District Council of Karoonda East Murray.

References

Karoonda